Norbert Nuttelman (March 8, 1911 – June 14, 1986) was an American Republican politician and farmer from Wisconsin.

Born in La Crosse County, Wisconsin, Nuttelman was educated in the public schools in West Salem, Wisconsin. Nuttelman was a farmer and worked with the Farmers Home Administration. He served in the Wisconsin State Assembly 1961–1969. After his career in the Wisconsin Assembly, Nuttelman served on the La Crosse County Board of Supervisors until April 1986, when his health failed him.
Has one son name John Nuttelman

Notes

People from La Crosse County, Wisconsin
County supervisors in Wisconsin
1911 births
1986 deaths
20th-century American politicians
Republican Party members of the Wisconsin State Assembly